Ri Hyon-ok may refer to:

 Ri Hyon-ok (sport shooter) (born 1970), North Korean sport shooter
 Ri Hyon-ok (weightlifter) (born 1984), North Korean weightlifter